Belmont Lake is a lake in geographic Belmont Township in the municipality of Havelock-Belmont-Methuen, Peterborough County in Central Ontario, Canada. It is part of the water system that feeds the Trent Severn Waterway Great Lakes Basin. 

There are 2 watercourses (rivers) that flow into Belmont and one exiting. The first river comes from the north from Cordova Lake and is navigable by small boat from the northwest part of Belmont Lake up the river for approximately 1 km. It has deep and shallow sections and some areas that are rocky. The second inflow which comes from Brackenridge Bay on Round Lake is on the west side at approximately the middle point of the lake. There is a small waterfall flowing into the lake that varies in size depending on water levels at certain times of the year.  The Crowe River outflow is on the east side at approximately the middle point of the lake. This river is navigable by small boat for approximately 1 km by navigating some deep and shallow rocky sections. The Crowe River dam is located at the end separating Belmont Lake from Crowe Lake. Belmont Lake has approximately 50 islands. Several of the islands are named. The largest is Big island. It is approximately 1 km long and 375 metres at its widest point. There are approximately 45 cottages on the island. The island is located in the middle of the lake. Belmont has a long history of cottagers because of its natural beauty. It is located on the southernmost point of the Canadian shield which is why most of the islands and surroundings are rocky. 

Rumour has it that Belmont was suggested to be named Loon Lake because of the numerous loons found and heard on the lake year after year. 

Belmont has a healthy fish population. Muskie populations which were healthy some years ago have declined due to the non-native Pike species that have made their way into the lake. Other species such as Perch, Bass, Bluegill, Catfish, and Pickerel are also found in the lake.

The old mills (no longer present) known as Ashby Mill and Rockdale are located on the south shore and at the Crowe River outflow respectively. The most southern part of the lake has a large bay called King Bay. The most northern part of the lake has a large bay called Deer Bay. It is approximately 7.5 km from the southern part of the main lake to the north part of the main lake. it is approximately 3.1 km wide at its widest point from the river inflow on the west to the river outflow on the east. Many of the older cottages are still present on Belmont Lake allowing it to maintain its "cottagey" feel.

References

Other map sources:

Lakes of Peterborough County